Kristian Elster (17 March 1881 – 6 November 1947) was a Norwegian novelist, literary historian, theatre critic, and biographer.

Biography
Kristian Elster was born in Trondheim, Norway as the son of the author Kristian Elster (1841–1881) and Sanna Fasting (1845–1926). In 1888, he moved with his mother to Oslo. He was educated as a lawyer, and in 1910 he became a secretary in the Ministry of Agriculture.

Elster published 40 novels, plays, and narratives. He made his literary début in 1907 with the story collection Fortællinger. His literary breakthrough was the trilogy of novels I lære (1911), Landeveien (1912)  and Mester (1913). He wrote the two-volume literary history Illustrert norsk litteraturhistorie, published in 1923–24.

In 1941, he was awarded the literature prize Gyldendal's Endowment (Gyldendals legat for norsk litteratur).

Selected works
Fjeldets fange; digte (1916) 
Fra tid til anden (1920)
Den ensomme ø; en fortaelling om tre gutter (1921)

References

Other sources
	Kielland, Eugenia Marie (1950) Min venn Kristian Elster 	(Oslo, Aschehoug)

External links
 

1881 births
1947 deaths
People from Trondheim
20th-century Norwegian novelists
Norwegian theatre critics
Norwegian literary historians